CBC Marketplace is a Canadian investigative consumer program which has been broadcast on CBC Television since 1972. The program  investigates consumer reports on issues such as product testing, health and safety, fraudulent business practices, and also tests government and industry promises.

History 
The program was influential in the banning of urea formaldehyde foam insulation and lawn darts in Canada, the legislation of warnings on exploding pop bottles, successful prosecution of retailers for false advertising, new standards for bottled water and drinking fountains, new regulations to make children's sleepwear less flammable, and the implementation of safer designs for children's cribs.

In recent years, the program's reporting has exposed the illegal dumping and burning of Canadian plastic recycling in Malaysia, the sale of fake university degrees to Canadian professors and social workers, and its hidden camera investigations documented hygiene issues in hospitals, misleading sales practices, and violence and neglect in long-term care homes.

Investigations have led to corporate and government changes: Google Maps launched a review of the country's locksmith listings after the identification of dozens of fake listings and reviews.  Ontario's real estate board launched an investigation and review of its agents after the program documented agents breaking rules around “double-ending”.

When the program's original lab testing found dangerous levels of cadmium in jewelry sold by Ardene and Aldo, journalists travelled to China to expose how these chemicals end up on Canadian store shelves. The episode prompted an investigation by Health Canada and changes in the companies’ suppliers.

One of its most popular programs involved an international investigation tracking the people behind those annoying fake Canada Revenue scams and tech support scams.  The reporting triggered “Project Octavia”, a criminal investigation by the country's top police force (RCMP). In February 2020, journalists were granted exclusive access to document the arrest of Canadian “super money mules” alleged to have been working with criminals in India to defraud Canadian victims.

Marketplace was originally hosted by Joan Watson and George Finstad. Joan Watson eventually married one of the first producers of the show, Murray Creed. Other hosts have included Bill Paul, Harry Brown, Norma Kent, Jacquie Perrin, Christine Johnson, Erica Johnson, Jim Nunn, Tom Harrington and Wendy Mesley. The program's current hosts are David Common, Charlsie Agro and Asha Tomlinson.

Early seasons of the program had a theme song, "The Consumer", which was written and performed by Stompin' Tom Connors. For several years, every episode would begin with Connors singing the song, which became a hit.

The National airs a weekly segment that is based on the week's episode on Thursday nights.

References

External links
 
 
 

1970s Canadian television news shows
1980s Canadian television news shows
1990s Canadian television news shows
2000s Canadian television news shows
2010s Canadian television news shows
2020s Canadian television news shows
1972 Canadian television series debuts
CBC Television original programming
CBC News
Consumer protection television series
Current affairs shows